The 2018 Conference USA baseball tournament was held between May 24 and May 28 at MGM Park in Biloxi, Mississippi.  The annual tournament determines the conference champion of the Division I Conference USA for college baseball.  As tournament champion, Southern Mississippi received the league's automatic bid to the 2018 NCAA Division I baseball tournament.

The tournament was established in 1996, Conference USA's first season of play.  Rice has won the most championships, with seven, including 2017.

Seeding and format
The top eight finishers from the regular season will be seeded one through eight.  The tournament will use a double elimination format.

Bracket and results

Conference championship

References

Tournament
Conference USA Baseball Tournament
Conference USA baseball tournament
Conference USA baseball tournament
College sports tournaments in Mississippi
Baseball competitions in Mississippi
Sports in Biloxi, Mississippi